Jean Palluch (23 December 1923 – 17 February 1991) was a French footballer. He competed in the men's tournament at the 1948 Summer Olympics.

References

External links

1923 births
1971 deaths
French footballers
Olympic footballers of France
Footballers at the 1948 Summer Olympics
People from Tarnobrzeg County
Association football midfielders
Stade de Reims players
Olympique Lyonnais players
AS Monaco FC players
Le Havre AC players
FC Rouen players
Olympique de Marseille players
Polish emigrants to France